Fernando Verdasco was the defending champion, but lost to Sam Querrey in the semifinals.
Jack Sock won his first ATP singles title, defeating Querrey in the final, 7–6(11–9), 7–6(7–2).

Seeds
The top four seeds receive a bye into the second round. 

 Feliciano López (quarterfinals)
 Roberto Bautista Agut (second round)
 Kevin Anderson (semifinals)
 John Isner (second round)
 Santiago Giraldo (quarterfinals)
 Fernando Verdasco (semifinals)
 Jérémy Chardy (quarterfinals)
 Sam Querrey (final)

Draw

Finals

Top half

Bottom half

Qualifying

Seeds

Qualifiers

Qualifying draw

First qualifier

Second qualifier

Third qualifier

Fourth qualifier

References
Main Draw
Qualifying Draw

Singles